The 1945–46 Duke Blue Devils men's basketball team represented Duke University during the 1945–46 men's college basketball season. The head coach was Gerry Gerard, coaching his fourth season with the Blue Devils. The team finished with an overall record of 21–6.

References 

Duke Blue Devils men's basketball seasons
Duke
1945 in sports in North Carolina
1946 in sports in North Carolina